Sir Arthur Frederick Blakiston, 7th Baronet, MC (d Salisbury ) was a rugby union international wing who represented England twelve times between 1920 and 1925, and the British Lions in all four test matches during their 1924 tour of South Africa.

Blakiston was educated at Bedford School, Trent College and Emmanuel College, Cambridge. He served in the Great War as an officer in the Royal Field Artillery and was awarded the Military Cross. He played for Northampton, Liverpool, Blackheath and the Barbarians.
A farmer, he was Master of the South Shropshire Foxhounds.

References

1892 births
1974 deaths
Alumni of Emmanuel College, Cambridge
Barbarian F.C. players
Baronets in the Baronetage of Great Britain
Blackheath F.C. players
British & Irish Lions rugby union players from England
British Army personnel of World War I
England international rugby union players
English rugby union players
Liverpool St Helens F.C. players
Masters of foxhounds in England
Northampton Saints players
People educated at Bedford School
People educated at Trent College
People from West Derby
Recipients of the Military Cross
Royal Field Artillery officers
Rugby union players from Liverpool
Rugby union wings